Don José María de Areilza y Martínez-Rodas, Count of Motrico (3 August 1909, in Portugalete, Vizcaya – 22 February 1998, in Madrid) was a Spanish politician, engineer and ambassador.

During the Spanish civil war he became Mayor of the city of Bilbao in 1938. Between 1947 and 1964 he served as Spanish Ambassador to Buenos Aires, Washington DC and Paris. In 1964 he resigned from his office and was asked by the King in exile to lead the monarchist opposition to general Franco, as Secretary General of his Private Council. Between 1975 and 1976 he was the first Foreign Affairs Minister of the new King Juan Carlos I. In 1976, along with Pío Cabanillas he founded the short-lived People's Party, which later became part of the UCD, although he left after disagreements with Adolfo Suárez. In 1979 he was elected to the Congress of Deputies for Madrid district for the Coalición Democrática. In 1981 he became President of the Assembly of the Council of Europe and in 1997 he was elected member of the Spanish Royal Academy. He wrote over 3000 newspaper articles and 12 books. His wife died in 1991.

1909 births
1998 deaths
People from Portugalete
Union of the Democratic Centre (Spain) politicians
Members of the 1st Congress of Deputies (Spain)
Foreign ministers of Spain
Mayors of Bilbao
Ambassadors of Spain to Argentina
Ambassadors of Spain to France
Ambassadors of Spain to the United States
Politicians from the Basque Country (autonomous community)